Durham (formerly known as Clarington—Scugog—Uxbridge) is a federal electoral district in Ontario, Canada, that has been represented in the House of Commons of Canada from 1904 to 1968 and since 1988.

Its first iteration was created in 1903 from Durham East and Durham West ridings. It consisted of the county of Durham. The electoral district was abolished in 1966 when it was merged into the Northumberland—Durham riding. It was recreated in 1987 from parts of the Durham—Northumberland and Ontario ridings.

The second incarnation of the riding initially consisted of the Town of Newcastle, the townships of Scugog and Uxbridge, Scugog Indian Reserve No. 34, the part of the City of Oshawa lying north of Rossland Road, the allowance for road in front of lots 1, 2, 3 and 4, Concession 3 and part of the Town of Whitby lying north of Taunton Road.

In 1996, it was redefined to consist of the Township of Scugog, Scugog Indian Reserve No. 34, the Town of Clarington and part of the City of Oshawa lying north of a line drawn from west to east along Taunton Road, south along Ritson Road North, east along Rossland Road East, south along Harmony Road North and east along King Street East.

The electoral district was abolished in 2003 when it was redistributed between Clarington—Scugog—Uxbridge, Oshawa and Whitby—Oshawa ridings. Clarington—Scugog—Uxbridge was defined to consist of the townships of Uxbridge and Scugog, the Municipality of Clarington and the Mississaugas of Scugog Island reserve. In 2004, Clarington—Scugog—Uxbridge was renamed to its current name of Durham. Following the Canadian federal electoral redistribution of 2012, the riding lost territory to Pickering—Uxbridge and Northumberland—Peterborough South and gained territory from Oshawa and Whitby—Oshawa. 

On August 24, 2020, Durham MP Erin O'Toole won the Conservative Party leadership election and was named Leader of the Official Opposition.

Demographics

Ethnic groups (2006): 95.00% White, 1.52% Black, 1.24% Aboriginal
Languages (2016): 87.20% English, 1.56% French, 9.96% Non-official languages
Religions (2001): 52.26% Protestant, 24.13% Catholic, 2.97% Other Christian, 19.92% No religion
Median income (2015): $40,747

Members of Parliament 

This riding has elected the following Members of Parliament:

Current Member of Parliament
This seat is currently held by Erin O'Toole of the Conservative Party of Canada, who also served as Leader of the Conservative Party of Canada from 2020 to early 2022. O'Toole, a former captain in the Royal Canadian Air Force, was first elected in the 2012 by-election.

Election results

Durham, 2004–present

Clarington—Scugog—Uxbridge, 2003–2004

Durham, 1987–2003

Durham, 1904–1968

See also
 List of Canadian federal electoral districts
 Past Canadian electoral districts

Notes

External links 
Canada Votes 2006 - Result for Durham  from the Canadian Broadcasting Corporation
Riding history 1904-1968 from the  Library of Parliament
Riding history 1988-2003 from the Library of Parliament
Riding history 2004-208 from the  Library of Parliament
2011 Results from Elections Canada 
 Campaign expense data from Elections Canada

Ontario federal electoral districts
Clarington
Politics of Oshawa